Andrey Vyacheslavovich Kuraev (born 15 February 1963) is a Protodeacon of the Russian Orthodox Church, notable Orthodox theologian and missionary.

Biography 
Kuraev studied at the Moscow Theological Academy Seminary between 1985 and 1988, and graduated from the Moscow Theological Academy in 1992. He studied at the Bucharest Theological Institute, Bucharest, Romania between 1988 and 1990.

Kuraev became a deacon on 29 November 1990, and on 5 April 2009, he became a Protodeacon of the Russian Orthodox Church. He was the dean of the Russian Orthodox University between 1993 and 1996.

Dogma. Ceremony."

In 2004, following the Beslan school siege, Kuraev wrote a book entitled "How to Relate to Islam after Beslan", igniting an intense emotional discussion in Russian society. A similar, and even more intense, discussion occurred after Kuraev commented on the ethnic and religious background of the Tsarnaev brothers, the masterminds behind the Boston Marathon bombing in April 2013.

In 2005, Kuraev tried to organize the picket "to defend Russian Christmas" near Catholic Cathedral in Moscow. The picket was scheduled for 24 December, when Catholics celebrate Christmas, with the slogans: "Russian Christmas is 7 January", "Stop the defamation of Russian Orthodox Church!”, "Orthodox Church is not late. It is loyal!”

In 2006, Kuraev succeeded in organizing anti-Madonna's Confessions Tour concert protests with the slogan "Madonna", go home!". Kuraev was mostly offended by the singer's so-called "pseudonym" and complete lack of religious common knowledge. In 2013, he welcomed Madonna's new "illegal gastarbeiter" status in Russia, adding that "her masturbation on stage using a crucifix is not an art". In 2019, Kuraev, a vivid Russian rock fan, said Wikipedia was his source of knowledge about the entertainer: "It's written in there that she was inserting a crucifix into her vagina and masturbated with it during her concerts. It doesn't inspire me".

Several media outlets reported that Kuraev criticized the politics of the Mejlis of the Crimean Tatar People, the ethnic parliament of the Crimean Tatars, during a lecture tour in Crimea in September 2006. He drew an analogy between the policy of the mejlis and mob behavior among young men in society.

Kuraev was named "man of the year" by a media organization in 2008.

Since October 2013, Kuraev has written about the existence of the "gay lobby" inside the Russian Orthodox Church, provoking various negative responses from church officials.

On 30 December 2013, the science board of Moscow Theological Academy dismissed Kuraev from its staff, due to his media activity and his blog. He has expressed outrage at the decision, attributing it to revenge from his alleged "gay lobby" for his part in revealing a scandal regarding homosexual activity at the Kazan Theological Seminary. The scandal resulted in an investigation, a cleric being fired in March 2014, and the dismissal of most administration members. Kuraev has also been outspoken about the criminal process and prison punishment of Pussy Riot group members.

On 29 December 2020 the Moscow Episcopal Court defrocked Kuraev, but to come into force this decision must be approved by the Patriarch.

On 23 August 2022, the Nikulinsky Raion Court in Moscow fined Kuraev 30 thousand Russian rubles for "discreditation" of the Russian Armed Forces that he allegedly did in his LiveJournal post about the 2022 Russian invasion of Ukraine.

Publications 
 Kuraev A. Provocarile ecumenismului. Bucuresti, ed. Sofia, 2006. (Romanian)
 Kuraev A.V. "Harry Potter" in church: between anaphema and smile: Should one give an indulgence to fairy tales? Is the magical non-dead demonic? ... Truth of «Harry Potter» — Neva, 2003. — 123 pages — 
 Kuraev A.V. «Harry Potter»: a try to be not scared / Deacon Andrey Kuraev. — Andreevskiy flag, 2004. — 205 pages — 
 Kuraev A.V. Gifts and anaphemas : what Christianity brought to word? : thoughts on the edge of millennium. / Nikea; Arefa, 2009. — 319 pages — 
 Kuraev A. Daruri si anathemele. Bucuresti, 2004. (Romanian)
 Kuraev A. Tajemnica Izraela // Fronda. Warszawa, 1999, No. 17/18. (Polish)
 Kuraev A.V. How to relate to Islam after Beslan? / Deacon Andrey Kuraev. — 2004 — 127 pages — 
 Kuraev A. Mostenirea lui Hristos. Ceea ce n-a intrat in Evanghelie. Bucuresti, ed. Sofia, 2009 (Romanian)
 Non-American missioner / Deacon Andrey Kuraev. — Saratov, 2006. — 463 pages — 
 Religy without God. — 2006. — 527 pages. — 
 Kuraev A. Pecetea lui antihrist, codurile de bare si semnele vremurilor. Bucuresti, 2005.(Romanian)
 Kuraev A.V. Fantasy and truth of "The Da Vinci Code": AST-Zebra, 2006.
 Kuraev A. Pantheism and Monotheism // The Russian Idea. In search of a new identity. Ed. By Wendy Helleman. Bloomington, Indiana, 2004. (Partial translation to English)
 Kuraev A.V. Christianity on the edge of history : About our defeat / Deacon Andrey Kuraev. : Palomnik, 2003. — 
 Kuraev A.V. Church and youth : is the conflict imminent? And about rock music... Rus. ostrov, 2004. — 
 David Baggett Harry Potter and Philosophy: If Aristotle Ran Hogwarts ; [from English] [afterword by Deacon Andrey Kuraev]. — Amfora 2005. (Lenizdat). — 430 pages — (Novaya Evrika). —

Notes

References

External links 
 

1963 births
Living people
Clergy from Moscow
Russian Orthodox Christians from Russia
Eastern Orthodox deacons
Russian television personalities
Christian critics of Islam
Moscow State University alumni
Russian activists against the 2022 Russian invasion of Ukraine